Cambridge Municipal Airport  is three miles south of Cambridge, in Guernsey County, Ohio. The FAA's National Plan of Integrated Airport Systems for 2011–2015 categorized it as a general aviation facility.

Many U.S. airports use the same three-letter location identifier for the FAA and IATA, but this facility is CDI to the FAA and has no IATA code.

Facilities
Its single runway, 4/22, is 4,298 by 75 feet (1,310 x 23 m) asphalt.

In the year ending September 23, 2010 the airport had 6,040 aircraft operations, average 16 per day: 92% general aviation, 7% air taxi, and 1% military. 22 single-engine aircraft were then based at the airport.

References

External links 
 Airport page at Cambridge, OH website
 Aerial photo as of 14 April 1994 from USGS The National Map
 

Airports in Ohio
Transportation in Guernsey County, Ohio
Buildings and structures in Guernsey County, Ohio